The 2023 season is Hougang United's 2nd consecutive season in the Women Premier league. 

The women team played in the Women Premier league.

Squad

Women's Squad

Coaching staff

Transfers

In

Pre-season

Mid-season

Note 1:

Loan Return 
Pre-season

Note 1: 

Mid-season

Out
Pre-season

Mid-season

Note 1:

Loan out
Pre-season

Note 1: Harhys Stewart returns on loan to GYL for another season.

Retained / Extension

Friendlies

Pre-Season Friendly

Team statistics

Appearances and goals

Competition

Women's Premier League

League table

See also 
 2014 Hougang United FC season
 2015 Hougang United FC season
 2016 Hougang United FC season
 2017 Hougang United FC season
 2018 Hougang United FC season
 2019 Hougang United FC season
 2020 Hougang United FC season
 2021 Hougang United FC season
 2022 Hougang United FC season
 2023 Hougang United FC season

Notes

References 

Hougang United FC
Hougang United FC seasons
2023
1